Spondylolisthesis is the displacement of one spinal vertebra compared to another. While some medical dictionaries define spondylolisthesis specifically as the forward or anterior displacement of a vertebra over the vertebra inferior to it (or the sacrum), it is often defined in medical textbooks as displacement in any direction. Spondylolisthesis is graded based upon the degree of slippage of one vertebral body relative to the subsequent adjacent vertebral body. Spondylolisthesis is classified as one of the six major etiologies: degenerative, traumatic, dysplastic, isthmic, pathologic, or post-surgical. Spondylolisthesis most commonly occurs in the lumbar spine, primarily at the L5-S1 level with the L5 vertebral body anteriorly translating over the S1 vertebral body.

Types
Olisthesis (synonym olisthy) is a term that more explicitly denotes displacement in any direction. Forward or anterior displacement can specifically be called anterolisthesis. Anterolisthesis commonly involves the fifth lumbar vertebra. Backward displacement is called retrolisthesis. Lateral displacement is called lateral listhesis or laterolisthesis.

A hangman's fracture is a specific type of spondylolisthesis where the second cervical vertebra (C2) is displaced anteriorly relative to the C3 vertebra due to fractures of the C2 vertebra's pedicles.

Anterolisthesis

Classification
Anterolisthesis can be categorized by cause, location and severity.

By causes
 Degenerative anterolisthesis (a.k.a. type 3) is a disease of the older adult that develops as a result of facet arthritis and joint remodeling. Joint arthritis, and ligamentum flavum weakness, may result in slippage of a vertebra. Degenerative forms are more likely to occur in women, persons older than fifty, and African Americans.
 Traumatic anterolisthesis is rare and results from acute fractures in the neural arch, other than the pars.
 Dysplastic anterolisthesis (a.k.a. type 1) results from congenital abnormalities of the upper sacral facets or inferior facets of the fifth lumbar vertebra, and accounts for 14% to 21% of all anterolisthesis.
 Isthmic anterolisthesis (a.k.a. type 2) is caused by a defect in the pars interarticularis but it can also be seen with an elongated pars.
 Pathologic anterolisthesis (a.k.a. type 5) is caused by either infection or a malignancy.
 Post-surgical/iatrogenic anterolisthesis (a.k.a. type 6) is caused by complications after surgery.

By location
Anterolisthesis location includes which vertebrae are involved, and may also specify which parts of the vertebrae are affected.

Isthmic anterolisthesis is where there is a defect in the pars interarticularis. It is the most common form of spondylolisthesis; also called spondylolytic spondylolisthesis, it occurs with a reported prevalence of 5–7 percent in the US population. A slip or fracture of the intravertebral joint is usually acquired between the ages of 6 and 16 years, but remains unnoticed until adulthood. Roughly 90 percent of these isthmic slips are low-grade (less than 50 percent slip) and 10 percent are high-grade (greater than 50 percent slip). It is divided into three subtypes:
 A: pars fatigue fracture
 B: pars elongation due to multiple healed stress effects
 C: pars acute fracture

Severity
Classification by degree of the slippage, as measured as percentage of the width of the vertebral body: Grade I spondylolisthesis accounts for approximately 75% of all cases.
 Grade I: 0–25%
 Grade II: 25–50%
 Grade III: 50–75%
 Grade IV: 75–100%
 Grade V: greater than 100%

Signs and symptoms
Symptoms of lumbar anterolisthesis include:
 A general stiffening of the back and a tightening of the hamstrings, with a resulting change in both posture and gait.
 A leaning-forward or semi-kyphotic posture may be seen, due to compensatory changes.
 A "waddle" may be seen in more advanced causes, due to compensatory pelvic rotation due to decreased lumbar spine rotation.
 A result of the change in gait is often a noticeable atrophy in the gluteal muscles due to lack of use.
 Generalized lower-back pain may also be seen, with intermittent shooting pain from the buttocks to the posterior thigh, and/or lower leg via the sciatic nerve.

Other symptoms may include tingling and numbness. Coughing and sneezing can intensify the pain. An individual may also note a "slipping sensation" when moving into an upright position. Sitting and trying to stand up may be painful and difficult.

Physical Exam 
The major components of the physical exam for spondylolisthesis consists of observation, palpation, and maneuvers. The most common finding is pain with lumbar extension. The following physical involves specific assessment for spondylolisthesis. However, a general examination, most importantly neurological examination, must be done to rule out alternative causes for signs and symptoms. Neurological examination is often normal in patients with spondylolisthesis, but lumbosacral radiculopathy is commonly seen in patients with degenerate spondylolisthesis.

Observation 
The patient should be observed walking and standing. Most patients present with a normal gait. An abnormal gait is often the sign of a high grade case. A patient with high grade spondylolisthesis may present with a posterior pelvic tilt causing a loss in the normal contour of the buttocks. An antalgic gait, rounded back and decreased hip extension, can result from severe pain. While standing, the patient should be observed from the front, back, and sides. Increased and decreased lumbar lordosis, inward curvature of the lower spine, has been seen.

Palpation 
Detection of spondylolisthesis by palpation is most often done by palpating for the spinous process. Each level of the lumbar spine should be palpated. Spinous process palpation by itself is not a definitive method for the detection of spondylolisthesis.

Maneuvers 
 Spinal range of motion testing – Range of motion limitations may be seen.
 Lumbar hyperextension – Extension often elicits pain. This can be assessed by having the patient hyperextend the lumbar spine, provide resistance against back extensions, or undergo repeated lumbar extensions.
 Sport-specific motion – Patient can be asked to repeat aggravating movements that they experience during their activity. During the movement, ask patient to point to any places with focal pain.
 Straight leg raise – Maneuver used to assess for hamstring tightness. The straight leg raise has been found to be positive in only 10% of patients with spondylolisthesis.
 Muscle strength exercises – Lower abdominal, gluteal, and lumbar extensors should be assessed for weakness. Weakness in these muscles can increase lordosis and contribute to sacroiliac instability. Abdominal flexor strength can be assessed with the abdominal flexor endurance test. The test involves the patient lying supine while holding a 45 degree flexed trunk and 90 degree flexed knees for 30 seconds. Gluteal strength can be assessed with a single-leg squat. Lastly, lumbar extension can be assessed with a single-leg bridge.

Diagnostic Imaging 
In adults with non-specific low back pain, strong evidence suggests medical imaging should not be done within the first six weeks. It is also suggested to avoid advanced imaging, such as CT or MRI, for adults without neurological symptoms or "red flags" in the patient's history. General recommendations for initial low back pain treatment is remaining active, avoiding twisting and bending, avoiding activities that worsen pain, avoiding bed rest, and possibly initiating a trial of non-steroidal anti-inflammatory drugs after consulting a physician. Children and adolescents with persistent low back pain may require earlier imaging and should be seen by physician. Once imaging is deemed necessary, a combination of plain radiography, computed tomography, and magnetic resonance imaging may be used. Images are most often taken of the lumbar spine due to spondylolisthesis most commonly involving the lumbar region. Images of the thoracic spine can be taken if a patient's history and physical suggest thoracic involvement.

Plain Radiography (X-Ray) 
Plain radiography is often the first step in medical imaging. Anteroposterior (front-back) and lateral (side) images are used to allow the physician to view the spine at multiple angles. Oblique view are no longer recommended. In evaluating for spondylolithesis, plain radiographs provide information on the positioning and structural integrity of the spine. Therefore, if further detail is needed a physician may request advanced imaging.

Magnetic Resonance Imaging (MRI) 
Magnetic resonance imaging is the preferred advanced imaging technique for evaluation of spondylolisthesis. Preference is due to effectiveness, lack of radiation exposure, and ability to evaluate for soft tissue abnormalities and spinal canal involvement. MRI is limited in its ability to evaluate fractures in great detail, compared to other advanced imaging modalities.

Computed Tomography (CT) 
Computed tomography can be helpful in evaluating bony vertebral abnormalities, such as fractures. This can be helpful in determining if the fracture is a new, old, and/or progressing fracture. CT use in spondylolisthesis evaluation is controversial due to high radiation exposure.

Treatment 
Spondylolisthesis patients without symptoms do not need to be treated.

Conservative
Non-operative management, also referred to as conservative treatment, is the recommended treatment for spondylolisthesis in most cases with or without neurological symptoms. Most patients with spondylolisthesis respond to conservative treatment. Conservative treatment consists primarily of physical therapy, intermittent bracing, aerobic exercise, pharmacological intervention, and epidural steroid injections. The majority of patients with degenerative spondylolisthesis do not require surgical intervention.
 Physical therapy can evaluate and address postural and compensatory movement abnormalities. Physical therapy primarily includes spinal flexion and extension exercises with a focus on core stabilization and muscle strengthening. In particular, lumbar spondylolisthesis may benefit from core stabilization exercises focusing on lower abdominal, lumbar muscles, hamstrings, and hip flexors, which may temporarily or permanently improve symptoms and improve general function.
 Some patients may benefit from bracing in combination with physical therapy. Additionally, bracing was found to be beneficial when performed immediately following the onset of symptoms, in particular patients with lumbar pars interarticular defects.
 Exercises such as cycling, elliptical training, swimming, and walking are considered low-impact aerobic exercises and are recommended for pain relief.
 Anti-inflammatory medications (NSAIDS) in combination with paracetamol can be tried initially. If a severe radicular component is present, a short course of oral steroids such as prednisone or methylprednisolone can be considered. Epidural steroid injections, either interlaminal or transforaminal, performed under fluoroscopic guidance can help with severe radicular (leg) pain, but lacks conclusive benefit in relieving back pain in lumbar spondylolisthesis.
Chiropractic Specific spinal manipulation identifies the joints that are restricted or those that show abnormal motion. A gentle thrusting technique that helps to return motion to the joint by stretching the soft tissues and stimulating the nervous system. The purpose is to facilitate movement above and below the anterior slipped vertebrae. Other techniques are non thrusting flexion distraction or instrument assisted adjusting.

Surgical 
There are no clear radiological or medical guidelines or indications for surgical interventions in degenerative spondylolisthesis. A minimum of three months of conservative management should be completed prior to considering surgical intervention. Three indications for potential surgical treatment are as follows: persistent or recurrent back pain or neurologic pain with a persistent reduction of quality of life despite a reasonable trial of conservative (non-operative) management, new or worsening bladder or bowel symptoms, or a new or worsening neurological deficit.
Both minimally invasive and open surgical techniques are used to treat anterolisthesis.

Retrolisthesis

A retrolisthesis is a posterior displacement of one vertebral body with respect to the subjacent vertebra to a degree less than a luxation (dislocation). Retrolistheses are most easily diagnosed on lateral x-ray views of the spine. Views, where care has been taken to expose for a true lateral view without any rotation, offer the best diagnostic quality.

Retrolistheses are found most prominently in the cervical and lumbar region, but can also be seen in the thoracic area.

History
Spondylolisthesis was first described in 1782 by Belgian obstetrician Herbinaux. He reported a bony prominence anterior to the sacrum that obstructed the vagina of a small number of patients.

See also
 Spondylosis
 Spondylolysis
 Failed back syndrome
 Joint dislocation

References

External links

Deforming dorsopathies
Congenital disorders of musculoskeletal system